Mean People Suck is an NYU student film released in 2001.  It is directed by Matthew Cole Weiss and stars Dominique Swain as Kate, James Franco as Casey, and Eric Christian Olsen as Nick, with a supporting role by Beverley Mitchell as Kate's sister.

Mean People Suck was available for viewing on Spike.com from 2007 to 2016.

Plot summary
Three stubborn teenagers place a bet over which one of them is the meanest.

Cast
 Dominique Swain as Kate
 James Franco as Casey
 Eric Christian Olsen as Nick
 Beverley Mitchell as Kate's sister
 Michael Higgins as Old Man
 Eric Axen as Joey
 Jack Ferver as Jesse Milton
 Matthew Cole Weiss as Boy in Funeral Home
 Julie Schubert as Diner Patron #1
 Beth Marshall as Diner Patron #2
 Ryan Shogren as Boy in Locker Room
 Rob Cameron as Boy in Locker Room #2
 Kevin Thoms as Boy in Locker Room #3

Release

Festival screenings
The film premiered at the First Run Film Festival in April, 2001, It screened at multiple festivals after that, receiving Best Student Film at the Fargo Film Festival on March 2, 2002.

References

External links
  Mean People Suck on YouTube
 

2001 films
American comedy short films
2001 comedy films
2000s English-language films
2000s American films